Heliotropic hypothesis is the process when social systems evolve toward the most positive images they hold of themselves.

See also 

 Management
 Self-image
 Social constructionism
 Social structure
 System dynamics

References 

Change management